Hongqiao Airport Terminal 1 is a station on Line 10 of the Shanghai Metro. It is located south of Terminal 1 of Hongqiao International Airport.

Railway stations in Shanghai
Line 10, Shanghai Metro
Shanghai Metro stations in Changning District
Airport railway stations in China
Railway stations in China opened in 2010